Guillermo Tovar de Teresa (Mexico City, August 23, 1956 – idem, November 10, 2013) was a Mexican historian and an art collector (mainly of painting, literature and ancient books, deeply knowledgeable about the work of the great photographers in Mexico), bibliographer, philanthropist, cultural promoter, and scholar. He was a constant defender of the historical and artistic Mexican heritage, mainly from his hometown, of which he was chronicler, an appointment that was originally in charge of the Presidency and to which he resigned to propose the creation of the Council of the Chronicle of the City of Mexico. He was a specialist in the New Spain/Mexican colonial period art, history and literature. He published several books about Colonial Mexican art and collaborated, among others, for the newspaper La Jornada. He stood out for his early intelligence: he learned to read long before entering school, and at age 13 he was advisor to colonial art of the then president Gustavo Díaz Ordaz. At 23, he published his first book, Renaissance painting and sculpture in Mexico. He was a member of the Historical Center Executive Committee, corresponding member of the Royal Academy of Fine Arts of San Fernando, in Madrid, and honorary member of the Hispanic Society of America, the latter based in New York City. He was considered a candidate for the Aesthetic Research Institute of the National Autonomous University of Mexico, but never wanted to hold a public office or receive any salary. One of his brothers, Rafael Tovar y de Teresa, was since 2012 the head of National Council for Culture and the Arts and first secretary of Culture.  His house became, in December 2018, a museum, and is part of the Soumaya Museum.

Early years 

He learned to appreciate history and art books from a very young age, thanks to his grandfather, Guillermo de Teresa y Teresa, and his father, Dr. Rafael Tovar y Villa Gordoa, his "guardian figures". He said, that his grandfather had taught him to read in the pages of the newspaper... Self-taught by choice (I decided to train on my own (...) I was bored), lived away from universities. At the age of seven he received, from then President Adolfo López Mateos, "a medal in recognition of his dedication to the study of Mexican history and art." At age 11 he was invited by the historian Jorge Gurría Lacroix to collaborate in the National Institute of Anthropology and History. At age 12 he was appointed advisor to President Díaz Ordaz in matters of colonial art. At 14, he had already given his first lectures at the Institute of Aesthetic Research of the UNAM, and at a very young age he received a distinction from the Royal Academy of Fine Arts of San Fernando in Madrid. At 16 he concluded his formal investigation into the history of Tacubaya, years later published as Historical news of the Miguel Hidalgo Delegation.

Genealogy 

He was interested in investigating all the branches of his ancestry, passing through some of the largest and oldest families in the New Spain. In 2012, he submitted a request to succeed in the title of count of Gustarredondo, which litigated in Spain asking rights of possession. On the death of Guillermo Tovar, his nephew, Rafael Tovar y López-Portillo, son of Rafael Tovar y Teresa, director of Conaculta and grandson of the president José López-Portillo, requested the subrogation of the rights of his uncle in that title, because he is the firstborn. Guillermo Tovar was a great-grandson of Margarita López-Portillo y Rojas, in turn the sister of the lawyer, governor of the state of Jalisco, novelist, poet, playwright, journalist and language scholar José López Portillo y Rojas. Guillermo Tovar was also the maternal nephew of the writer José Bernardo Couto and maternal great-great-grandson of the writer José Joaquín Pesado.

Topics addressed in his works 

He wrote, among others, about the following topics:

 Baroque art
 Art of Mexico
 Culture of Mexico
 Viceregal art
 Architecture and carpentry Mudejar in the New Spain
 Gerónimo de Balbás
 Miguel Cabrera
 Metropolitan Cathedral of Mexico City (organs and altarpieces)
 Historic Center of Mexico City
 Photographer's, he was a deep connoisseur of the works by Julio Michaud, Désiré Charnay and Alfred Briquet
 History of Mexico
 Luis Lagarto
 New Spanish nuns
 Viceroyalty of New Spain utopia

The Council of the Chronicle of Mexico City 
Constituted before a notary and registered in the Tax Administration Service, this organization received on August 14, 2007 authorization from the Directorate of Legal Affairs of National Institute of Fine Arts to start their functions. Chaired from 2012 to date by Román Sánchez Fernández.

Chronicle Council Publications 
The publisher Editorial Trama, of Madrid, is formally the publisher of the Chronicle Council of Mexico City. Some of his publications are the following:

 In 2007, he published, together with the Secretariat of Education of the Federal District, the book Ciudad de México: Crónica de sus delegaciones (Mexico City: Chronicle of its delegations). It includes a presentation by Guillermo Tovar de Teresa and, at the end, an article by Carlos Monsiváis, one of the council members, along with Jesús Ramírez Cuevas. The climax is from Salvador Flores.
 In 2009, he published Ciudad de México: Crónica de sus delegaciones (Censorship and revolution: Books prohibited by the Inquisition of Mexico: 1790–1819), by the authorship of Guillermo Tovar de Teresa and the doctor in history and specialist in nineteenth-century Mexico Cristina Gómez Álvarez. This is an edition by the Windward collection.

Collecting and other interests 

 He had, within his vast collection of books, "first editions of (works of) Sr. Juana Inés de la Cruz", and also "the founding book of the Mexico City", an incunable: the treaty of architecture of Leon Battista Alberti (the edition of 1512, of Paris), with annotations by the Viceroy himself Antonio de Mendoza y Pacheco.
 He worked as an advisor, before 1983, of Juan José Bremer in the Undersecretariat of Culture, after having also worked with Pedro Ramírez Vázquez.
 He headed, next to the restaurateur Lucía Ruanova Abedrop, the citizen group "El Caballito, Conservación", a restoration plan, which he defended, for the damages suffered during his restoration, of the Equestrian statue of Charles IV of Spain in Mexico city knowns as El Caballito, by Manuel Tolsá. .
 He opened in Facebook a group that made a proactive space where he continuously difussed his musical, artistic, historical interests.
 He was an advisor, since its inception, on the project for the foundation of Casa Lamm.
 He gave a keynote speech on the occasion of the LXXXV anniversary of the foundation of the Miguel Lerdo de Tejada Library.

Other acknowledgments 
 Citizen Merit Medal, awarded by the Assembly of Representatives of the Federal District. 
 Commander's Cross of the Royal Order of Saints Mauritius and Lazarus, of Royal House of Savoy (2007).

Post Mortem 

 A tribute to him was held in the Auditorium "Jaime Torres Bodet", of the National Museum of Anthropology, conducted by the Mexican government on February 13, 2014, and headed by Emilio Chuayffet Chemor, Secretary of Public Education.
 His brothers decided to create the Guillermo Tovar de Teresa Award, which will recognize, every two years, the trajectory of a Mexican whose work seeks to preserve the heritage of Mexico.
 On August 6, 2014 a tribute was held in his memory at the Museum of Mexico City. The event, which included the inauguration of the bookstore number 24th of the Economic Culture Fund, which will bear its name in its memory, was held in the Museum of Mexico City, and was organized by the Ministry of Culture of the Federal District Government. Among others were: the president of the National Council for Culture and the Arts, Rafael Tovar y de Teresa, the director of the Economic Culture Fund, José Carreño Carlón, the writer Homero Aridjis.
 On December 20, 2018, it was announced that the home of Guillermo Tovar de Teresa would be the Guillermo Tovar de Teresa House in the street Valladolid 52, Colonia Roma Norte), a cultural site where the Soumaya Museum is located, sponsored by the Slim Foundation.

Bibliography

Authorship 
He published (some co-authored, but most individually) a total of 39 works in 44 volumes, including:

 Pintura y escultura del Renacimiento en México (Painting and sculpture of the Renaissance in Mexico) (1979)
 Noticias históricas de la Delegación Miguel Hidalgo (Historical news of the Miguel Hidalgo Delegation
 México barroco (Baroque Mexico) (1981)
 Apuntes y fotografías de México a mediados del siglo XIX – Álbum fotográfico mexicano – 1858– fotografías de Désiré Charnay (Notes and photographs of Mexico in the mid-19th century – Mexican photo album – 1858– photographs of Désiré Charnay published by Julio Michaud Publisher: Celanese mexicana) (1981)
 Renacimiento en México: artistas y retablos (Renaissance in Mexico: artists and altarpieces) (1982)
 La ciudad de México y la utopía en el siglo XVI (Mexico City and utopia in the 16th century) (1987)
 El arte de los Lagarto, iluminadores novohispanos de los siglos XVI y XVII (The art of the Lagarto, New Spanish illuminators of the 16th and 17th centuries) (1988)
 Bibliografía novohispana de arte (New Spanish bibliography of art) (two volumes, 1988)
 Miguel Cabrera, pintor de cámara de la reina celestial (Miguel Cabrera, chamber painter of the celestial queen) (1985)
 Gerónimo de Balbás en la Catedral de México (Gerónimo de Balbás in the Cathedral of Mexico) (1990)
 Los escultores mestizos del Barroco novohispano (The mestizo sculptors of the New Spanish Baroque) (1991)
 Pintura y escultura en Nueva España (Painting and sculpture in New Spain (1557–1640)) (four volumes, 1992)
 La ciudad de los palacios (The city of palaces) Publisher: Vuelta, (1990); prologue by Enrique Krauze
 Arte novohispano (New Spanish art) (three volumes, 1992)
 La utopía novohispana del siglo XVI: lo bello, lo verdadero y lo bueno (The 16th-century New Spanish utopia: the beautiful, the true and the good) (1992, in collaboration with Miguel León-Portilla and Silvio Zavala)
 Repertorio de artistas en México: artes plásticas y decorativas (Directory of artists in Mexico: plastic and decorative arts (three volumes, 1995)
 Cartas a Mariano Otero: 1829–1845 (Letters to Mariano Otero: 1829–1845) (1996)
 Catálogo de la colección de ex libris de Guillermo Tovar de Teresa (Collection catalog of ex libris by Guillermo Tovar de Teresa) (2002)
 La ciudad de los palacios: crónica de un patrimonio perdido (The city of palaces: chronicle of a lost heritage)
 La ciudad: un palimpsesto (The city: a palimpsest) (2004)
 El Pegaso o el mundo barroco novohispano en el siglo XVII (The Pegasus or the baroque world of New Spain in the 17th century (1993, reissue 2006)
 Crónica de una familia entre dos mundos: los Ribadeneira en México y España (Chronicle of a family between two worlds: the Ribadeneira in Mexico and Spain) (2009)
 Diccionario de artistas del siglo XX (Dictionary of artists of the twentieth century) (the new edition, which would include artists born before 1955, was being prepared)

Editions of the Council of the Chronicle of Mexico City 
 Coedition Council of the Chronicle of Mexico City – National Council for Culture and the Arts – National Institute of Fine Arts – National Conservatory of Music of facsimile of Memories of Mexico, piano scores composed by Luis Hahn with the original lithographys of the covers of the pieces. It includes a compact disc with the interpretation of the pieces (recording in Sala Nezahualcóyotl) by Silvia Navarrete. Introductory text "The lithographs of (M. C.) Rivera in the scores of Luis Hahn", by Guillermo Tovar and Teresa. Proem of María Teresa Franco. Memories of 'an appreciable pianist', or Mexico City seen from the piano, by Ricardo Miranda. Mexico. 2008.

Other collaborations 
 Prologue of the book Luis G. Jordá. A Catalan musician in Porfirian Mexico, by Cristian Canton Ferrer (2011)
 Text in the volume of photographs  Mexico 1910–1921: an imaginary of the Mexican Revolution . Process. 2010.
 Prologue of the book: Kahlo, G., and Greenwood Peabody, H. (2009). "Two views of the monumental architecture of Mexico." Mexico: Salinas Group.
 "La portada principal de la primitiva Catedral de México" In Collection of studies in tribute to Mariano Fernández Daza, IX Marquis de la Encomienda. Modesto Miguel Rangel Mayoral. Santa Ana de Almendralejo University Center, 2009.
 Presentation of Manual de la gente bien, by Guadalupe Loaeza (1995).
 Compilation of Bordados y bordadores, by Virginia Armella de Aspe (1992).

About Guillermo Tovar de Teresa 
 Guzmán Urbiola, Xavier (2013).  Guillermo Tovar de Teresa: biobibliographic sketch . Mexico: DGE / Equilibrista.

Unpublished 
 History of Mexico

See also 
 Rafael Tovar y de Teresa
 Soumaya Museum
 Conservation and restoration
 Historiography
 Iconography
 La Profesa (Oratory of San Felipe Neri)
 Francisco Cervantes de Salazar (16th century chronicler)
 Luis González Obregón (chronicler of Mexico City until 1937)
 Miguel León-Portilla (chronicler of Mexico City in 1974 and 1975)
 José Luis Martínez (chronicler of Mexico City from 1975 to 1985)
 Franz Mayer Traumann (German-Mexican collector)
 Carlos Monsiváis (chronicler of Mexico City)
 Salvador Novo (chronicler of Mexico City until 1974)
 Artemio de Valle Arizpe

External links 

 About the catalog of Guillermo Tovar de Teresa's collections (interview with Fernando Tovar y de Teresa) in Spanish

References 

Mexican art historians
Mexican philanthropists
Historians of Mexico